Isgaard Marke (born 1972 in Husum, Schleswig-Holstein, Germany) is a classically trained singer, who is also involved with the project Classic meets Pop. Her style resembles influences of the Kate Bush school as well as cold wave influences and modern ambient sounds. Her greatest hits were "Ein schöner Tag" and "Dream of You" with the dance project Schiller, in which she sang single, short lyrical lines.

In 2003, she participated in the German pre-selection for the Eurovision Song Contest and reached seventh place with the song "Golden Key". Her album of the same name achieved moderate success in Germany and reached the Top 10 in the Philippines. The album was released in more than 15 countries and contained the song "Dreams Will Never Die", a duet with Piero Mazzochetti. Videos were made for the songs "Earth Song" (originally by Michael Jackson) and "Dreams Will Never Die", the latter of which was occasionally broadcast on MTV.

Despite her international success she lost her contract with Edel Records, and a short time later she secured a contract with a small record label in Hamburg. She released Secret Gaarden in 2004.

She appeared on the German band Schiller's hit album "Weltreise" performing lead vocal on "Ein schöner Tag" which gained success in the German singles chart and she toured with Schiller.

In 2005, her single, "One World", recorded together with Lidia Kopania and David Serame (music for Ben's Manchmal), was released, the sales of which were donated to the South Asian relief organization Misereor. It was bought only by major fans, was not internationally distributed, and experienced problems in delivery to major music dealers.

A DVD is planned, which will finally enable the distribution of the videos to "Earth Song", "Dreams Will Never Die", and "One World". Additionally, it will contain five videos by a nature filmmaker, shot in Iceland.

In 2008, the third album 'Wooden Houses was released.

Among other activities Isgaard is singing in the three-women-band La Tiara.

Discography

Singles
 2003: Golden Key (single, 3 versions + "Lass mich frei" = "Set Me Free" on the album)
 2003: Earth Song (promo single, radio edit + "No Way Back to Eden")
 2005: One World (single, with Kind of Blue and David Serame + "Man on the Moon" from the album "Secret Gaarden" and "Morning Light" by Kind of Blue from the album "Beating the Morning Rush")

Albums
 2003: Golden Key (album, 12 tracks)
 2003: Golden Key (limited edition, 14 tracks)
 2004: Secret Gaarden (album, 13 tracks)
 2008: Wooden Houses
 2012: Playing God
 2014: Naked
 2015: The Early Days
 2016: WHITEOUT
 2019: Human

References

External links
 Homepage

1972 births
Living people
People from Husum
21st-century German women singers